Steam Corners is an unincorporated community in Troy Township, Morrow County, in the U.S. state of Ohio.

History
Steam Corners had its start when a steam-powered sawmill was built there, on account of which the town also received its name. A post office called Steam Corners was established in 1865, and remained in operation until 1901.

References

Unincorporated communities in Morrow County, Ohio
1865 establishments in Ohio
Unincorporated communities in Ohio